This is a list of rivers in the U.S. state of California, grouped by region. Major lakes and reservoirs, if applicable, are indicated in italics.

North Coast (north of Humboldt Bay)
Rivers and streams between the Oregon border and Humboldt Bay that empty into the Pacific Ocean (arranged north to south; tributaries with those entering nearest the sea first). Bold indicates rivers with more detailed lists in following sections.

Smith River (jump to tributaries)
Elk Creek
Wilson Creek
Klamath River (jump to tributaries)
Redwood Creek (jump to tributaries)
Little River
Mad River (jump to tributaries)

Smith River

Smith River
Rowdy Creek
Mill Creek
Myrtle Creek
South Fork Smith River
Craigs Creek
Coon Creek
Rock Creek
Gordon Creek
Goose Creek
Hurdygurdy Creek
Jones Creek
Buck Creek
Quartz Creek
Eightmile Creek
Harrington Creek
Prescott Fork Smith River
Middle Fork Smith River
Patrick Creek
Little Jones Creek
Monkey Creek
Siskiyou Fork Smith River
Griffin Creek
Knopki Creek
North Fork Smith River
Stony Creek
Still Creek
Diamond Creek

Klamath River

Klamath River
Hunter Creek
Turwar Creek
Blue Creek
West Fork Blue Creek
Nikowitz Creek
Crescent City Fork Blue Creek
East Fork Blue Creek
Ah Pah Creek
Tectah Creek
Pecwan Creek
Mettah Creek
Roach Creek
Tully Creek
Pine Creek
Trinity River (jump to tributaries)
Hopkins Creek
Copper Creek
Indian Creek
Bluff Creek
Fish Creek
East Fork Bluff Creek
Notice Creek
North Fork Bluff Creek
Slate Creek
Red Cap Creek
North Fork Red Cap Creek
Middle Fork Red Cap Creek
Boise Creek
Camp Creek
Pearch Creek
Salmon River (jump to tributaries)
Rogers Creek
Irving Creek
Rock Creek
Swillup Creek
Ukonom Creek
McCash Fork
King Creek
Independence Creek
Clear Creek
South Fork Clear Creek
Fivemile Creek
Tenmile Creek
Bear Valley Creek
Red Hill Creek
West Fork Clear Creek
Doe Creek
Oak Flat Creek
Elk Creek
East Fork Elk Creek
Doolittle Creek
Bear Creek
Granite Creek
Burney Valley Creek
Toms Valley Creek
Rainy Valley Creek
Indian Creek
Doolittle Creek
East Fork Indian Creek
South Fork Indian Creek
Twin Valley Fork Indian Creek
Mill Creek
Granite Creek
Green Creek
China Creek
Thompson Creek
Fort Goff Creek
Portuguese Creek
Seiad Creek
Grider Creek
Walker Creek
Scott River
Mill Creek
Kelsey Creek
Shackleford Creek
Indian Creek
Moffett Creek
Kidder Creek
Etna Creek
Sugar Creek
East Fork Scott River
South Fork Scott River
Shasta River
Yreka Creek
Oregon Slough
Little Shasta River
Willow Creek
Parks Creek
Whitney Creek
Cottonwood Creek
Bogus Creek
Jenny Creek
Butte Creek (joins the Klamath in Oregon)
Lost River (joins the Klamath in Oregon)
Rock Creek
Willow Creek
Mowitz Creek

Trinity River

Trinity River
Mill Creek
Tish Tang o Tang Creek
Horse Linto Creek
Willow Creek
South Fork Trinity River
Madden Creek
Grouse Creek
Mosquito Creek
Buckeye Creek
Hayfork Creek
Corral Creek
Salt Creek
Big Creek
Carr Creek
East Fork Hayfork Creek
Indian Valley Creek
Butter Creek
Plummer Creek
Rattlesnake Creek
Smoky Creek
Happy Camp Creek
East Fork South Fork Trinity River
Prospect Creek
Shell Mountain Creek
Sharber Creek
Quinby Creek
Hawkins Creek
New River
Bell Creek
Big Creek
China Creek
Panther Creek
Quinby Creek
Devils Canyon Creek
East Fork New River
Slide Creek
Virgin Creek
Canadian Creek
Big French Creek
Little French Creek
Price Creek
Manzanita Creek
Big Bar Creek
Sailor Bar Creek
North Fork Trinity River
East Fork North Fork Trinity River
Backbone Creek
Whites Creek
China Creek
Rattlesnake Creek
Gas Creek
Grizzly Creek
Canyon Creek
Big East Fork Canyon Creek
Little East Fork Canyon Creek
Oregon Gulch
Soldier Creek
Dutch Creek
Browns Creek
Little Creek
Reading Creek
Weaver Creek
Little Browns Creek
East Weaver Creek
West Weaver Creek
Indian Creek
Grass Valley Creek
Little Grass Valley Creek
Rush Creek
Deadwood Creek
Papoose Creek
Stuart Fork
Hobel Creek
Mule Creek
Stoney Creek
Owens Creek
Deep Creek
Boulder Creek
Deer Creek
Swift Creek
Granite Creek
East Fork Trinity River
Cedar Creek
Mumbo Creek
Crow Creek
Baker Creek
Coffee Creek
Little Boulder Creek
Boulder Creek
Sugar Pine Creek
East Fork Coffee Creek
North Fork Coffee Creek
Union Creek
South Fork Coffee Creek
Scorpion Creek
Eagle Creek
Ramshorn Creek
Bear Creek
Tangle Blue Creek
Scott Mountain Creek
Little Trinity River
Sherer Creek
Picayune Creek
Cedar Creek
Bear Creek
High Camp Creek

Salmon River
Salmon River
Merrill Creek
Somes Creek
Wooley Creek
Steinacher Creek
Bridge Creek
Rock Creek
Hancock Creek
North Fork Wooley Creek
Cuddihy Fork
Hell Hole Creek
Big Meadows Creek
South Fork Wooley Creek
Big Elk Fork
Butler Creek
Morehouse Creek
Nordheimer Creek
Crapo Creek
North Fork Salmon River
Little North Fork Salmon River
Russian Creek
Right Hand Fork North Fork Salmon River
South Fork Salmon River
Knownothing Creek
Methodist Creek
Black Bear Creek
Plummer Creek
St Claire Creek
Crawford Creek
Cecil Creek
East Fork South Fork Salmon River
Taylor Creek
Rush Creek
Little South Fork Salmon River

Redwood Creek
Redwood Creek (Humboldt County)
Prairie Creek (California)
Lost Man Creek
McArthur Creek
Tom McDonald Creek
Bridge Creek
Copper Creek
Devils Creek
Coyote Creek
Panther Creek
Garrett Creek
Lacks Creek
Minor Creek
Lupton Creek
Noisy Creek
High Prairie Creek
Minon Creek
Lake Prairie Creek
Bradford Creek
Pardee Creek
Twin Lakes Creek

Mad River
Mad River
Lindsay Creek
North Fork Mad River
Canon Creek
Maple Creek
Boulder Creek
Black Creek
Pilot Creek

Humboldt Bay
Primary streams entering Humboldt Bay are listed north to south beginning north of the entrance to the bay and continuing in a clockwise direction. Tributaries entering nearest the bay are listed first.

For additional detail on Humboldt Bay streams, see Humboldt Bay: Bay tributaries and sloughs.

Jacoby Creek
Eureka Slough
Freshwater Slough
Freshwater Creek
Elk River (California)
Salmon Creek (Northern Humboldt County)

North Coast (south of Humboldt Bay)

Rivers and streams between Humboldt Bay and the Golden Gate that empty into the Pacific Ocean (arranged north to south; tributaries with those entering nearest the sea first):

Eel River 
Salt River
Van Duzen River
Yager Creek
South Fork Eel River (see List of tributaries of the South Fork Eel River for additional detail)
Bull Creek
East Branch South Fork Eel River
Cedar Creek
Tenmile Creek
North Fork Eel River
Middle Fork Eel River
North Fork Middle Fork Eel River
Thatcher Creek
Black Butte River
Rice Fork
Outlet Creek
Bear River 
Mattole River 
North Fork Mattole River
Upper North Fork Mattole River
Usal Creek
Ten Mile River
Noyo River 
Big River 
Little River 
Albion River 
Big Salmon Creek
Little Salmon Creek
Navarro River 
Rancheria Creek
Anderson Creek
Garcia River 
Gualala River 
Wheatfield Fork 
Russian River 
East Fork Russian River
Ackerman Creek

For details of the Sonoma and Marin coasts, see List of watercourses in the San Francisco Bay Area.

San Francisco Bay

Streams that empty into San Francisco Bay or its tributary bays (arranged clockwise, starting at the north side of the Golden Gate; tributaries are listed from those entering nearest the bays to farthest). The Central Valley watershed feeding into Suisun Bay via the Sacramento–San Joaquin Delta is excluded; see the following section for the Sacramento and San Joaquin river systems.

For additional detail on Bay Area creeks, see List of watercourses in the San Francisco Bay Area.

San Pablo Bay (north of Carquinez Strait)
Corte Madera Creek
Novato Creek
Petaluma River
Sonoma Creek
Napa River
Carneros Creek

Suisun Bay
Suisun Slough
Corderia Slough
Suisun Creek
Montezuma Slough
Pacheco Creek (Contra Costa County)
Sacramento River (jump to tributaries)
San Joaquin River (jump to tributaries)

San Pablo Bay (south of Carquinez Strait) and San Francisco Bay
San Pablo Creek
Pinole Creek
San Leandro Creek
San Lorenzo Creek
Alameda Creek
Coyote Creek
Guadalupe River
Stevens Creek
San Francisquito Creek
Redwood Creek (San Mateo County)
San Mateo Creek
For additional detail on Bay Area creeks, see List of watercourses in the San Francisco Bay Area.

Sacramento–San Joaquin River Delta
The Sacramento and San Joaquin River systems drain the western slope of the Sierra Nevada and most of the Central Valley, forming the Sacramento–San Joaquin River Delta before emptying into Suisun Bay; together, they are the largest river system in California.

Sacramento River

Sacramento River
Cache Slough
Steamboat Slough (splits from the Sacramento River upstream near Courtland)
Elkhorn Slough
Miner Slough
Sacramento Deep Water Ship Channel (splits from the Sacramento River upstream at the Port of Sacramento)
Prospect Slough
Dickson Creek
Lindsey Slough
Shag Slough
Yolo Bypass (jump to tributaries) – manmade floodway, occasionally receiving floodwaters from the Sacramento River via Fremont Weir near Knights Landing.
Alamo Creek
Ulatis Creek
American River (jump to tributaries)
Dry Creek
Feather River (jump to tributaries)
Colusa Basin Drainage Canal
Sand Creek
Cortina Creek
Salt Creek
Stone Corral Creek
Funks Creek
Hunter Creek
Willow Creek
Butte Creek
Angel Slough
Little Chico Creek
Little Dry Creek
Little Butte Creek
West Branch Butte Creek
Stony Creek
Black Butte Dam and Black Butte Lake
North Fork Stony Creek
Grindstone Creek
Elk Creek
Briscoe Creek
Little Stony Creek
North Fork Stony Creek
Middle Fork Stony Creek
South Fork Stony Creek
Big Chico Creek
Mud Creek
Rock Creek
Burch Creek
Jewett Creek
Deer Creek
Thomes Creek
Mill Creek
Fish Creek
Mill Creek
Little Mill Creek
Elder Creek
Willow Creek
Oat Creek
Dye Creek
Antelope Creek
Little Antelope Creek
Red Bank Creek
Reeds Creek
Dibble Creek
Payne's Creek
Battle Creek
North Fork Battle Creek
South Fork Battle Creek
Cottonwood Creek
Hooker Creek
South Fork Cottonwood Creek
Dry Creek
Salt Creek
Cold Fork Cottonwood Creek
Buck Creek
Dry Creek
North Fork Cottonwood Creek
Roaring River
Wilson Creek
Jerusalem Creek
Moon Fork Cottonwood Creek
Middle Fork Cottonwood Creek
Beegum Creek
South Fork Beegum Creek
Ash Creek
Bear Creek
Cow Creek
Little Cow Creek
Swede Creek
Dry Creek
Cedar Creek
Oak Run Creek
Clover Creek
Old Cow Creek
Glendenning Creek
South Cow Creek
Clear Creek
South Fork Clear Creek
Whiskeytown Dam, Whiskeytown Lake
Crystal Creek
East Fork Clear Creek
Rock Creek
Keswick Dam, Keswick Reservoir
Spring Creek
Spring Creek
Slickrock Creek
Boulder Creek
Flat Creek
Shasta Dam, Shasta Lake
Backbone Creek
Pit River (jump to tributaries)
Salt Creek
Castle Creek
Soda Creek
North Fork Sacramento River
Middle Fork Sacramento River
South Fork Sacramento River

Yolo Bypass

Yolo Bypass
Putah Creek
Big Canyon Creek
Pleasant Creek
Monticello Dam, Lake Berryessa
Capell Creek
Pope Creek
Eticuera Creek
Hunting Creek
St Helena Creek
Willow Slough
Cache Creek
Bear Creek
Sulphur Creek
Rocky Creek
North Fork of Cache Creek
Long Valley Creek
Wolf Creek
Indian Valley Dam, Indian Valley Reservoir
Bartlett Creek
Clear Lake (inflow streams listed clockwise starting at outlet)
Kelsey Creek
Adobe Creek
Forbes Creek
Rodman Slough
Scotts Creek
Middle Creek
Clover Creek

American River

American River
Folsom Dam, Folsom Lake
North Fork American River
Middle Fork American River
Canyon Creek
Otter Creek
North Fork of the Middle Fork American River
El Dorado Canyon
Peavine Creek
Grouse Creek
Secret Canyon
Rubicon River
Long Canyon
Pilot Creek
South Fork Rubicon River
Gerle Creek
Hell Hole Dam, Hell Hole Reservoir
Five Lakes Creek
Duncan Canyon
French Meadows Dam, French Meadows Reservoir
Clipper Creek
Owl Creek
Bunch Canyon
Shirttail Canyon
Indian Creek
Canyon Creek
North Fork of North Fork American River
East Fork of North Fork of North Fork American River
Big Granite Creek
South Fork American River
Weber Creek
Greenwood Creek
Dutch Creek
Rock Creek
Slab Creek
Silver Creek
South Fork Silver Creek
Little Silver Creek
Union Valley Dam, Union Valley Reservoir
Jones Fork
Bassi Fork
Alder Creek
Silver Fork American River
Caples Creek
Pyramid Creek

Feather River

Feather River
Bear River
Algodon Slough
Best Slough
Hutchinson Creek
Feeds Creek
Dry Creek
Camp Far West Dam, Camp Far West Reservoir
Rock Creek
Wolf Creek
Rollins Dam, Rollins Reservoir
Greenhorn Creek
Steephollow Creek
Yuba River (jump to tributaries)
Honcut Creek
North Honcut Creek
South Honcut Creek
Oroville Dam and Lake Oroville
North Fork Feather River
Canyon Creek
West Branch Feather River
Concow Creek
Little West Fork Feather River
Big Kimshew Creek
Last Chance Creek
French Creek
Grizzly Creek
Bucks Creek
Chips Creek
Yellow Creek
East Branch North Fork Feather River
Rush Creek
Indian Creek
Wolf Creek
Lights Creek
Little Grizzly Creek
Last Chance Creek
Red Clover Creek
Dixie Creek
Squaw Queen Creek
Boulder Creek
Spanish Creek
Greenhorn Creek
Rock Creek
Middle Fork Feather River
South Fork Feather River
Sucker Run
Lost Creek
Little Grass Valley Dam, Little Grass Valley Reservoir
Fall River
Little North Fork Feather River
South Branch Middle Fork Feather River
Willow Creek
Bear Creek
Onion Valley Creek
Nelson Creek
Jamison Creek
Grizzly Creek
Sierra Valley Channels
Smithneck Creek
Little Last Chance Creek

Yuba River

Yuba River
Dry Creek
Deer Creek
Squirrel Creek
Englebright Dam, Englebright Lake
South Yuba River
Rush Creek
Rock Creek
Spring Creek
Humbug Creek
Poorman Creek
Canyon Creek
Lake Spaulding Dam, Lake Spaulding
Fordyce Creek
North Creek
Rattlesnake Creek
Castle Creek
Middle Yuba River
Oregon Creek
Kanaka Creek
Wolf Creek
East Fork Creek
Jackson Meadows Dam, Jackson Meadows Reservoir
North Yuba River
New Bullards Bar Dam, New Bullards Bar Reservoir
Slate Creek
Canyon Creek
Little Canyon Creek
Goodyears Creek
Downie River
Pauley Creek
Lavezzola Creek
Haypress Creek
Salmon Creek

Pit River

Pit River
McCloud River
Nosoni Creek
Chatterdown Creek
Squaw Valley Creek
Claiborne Creek
Hawkins Creek
Star City Creek
Angel Creek
Mud Creek
Ash Creek
Edson Creek
Squaw Creek
Salt Creek
North Fork Squaw Creek
Potem Creek
Roaring Creek
Iron Canyon Creek
Kosk Creek
Nelson Creek
Rock Creek
Clark Creek
Burney Creek
Hat Creek
Rising River
Lost Creek
Fall River
Tule River
Little Tule River
Bear Creek
Beaver Creek
Horse Creek
Ash Creek
Willow Creek
Dutch Flat Creek
Taylor Creek
Turner Creek
Toms Creek
Clover Swale Creek
Canyon Creek
Rattlesnake Creek
North Fork Pit River
Pine Creek
Parker Creek
Thoms Creek
Joseph Creek
Goose Lake (historical)
South Fork Pit River
Fitzhugh Creek
Dry Creek
Cedar Creek
Mill Creek
East Creek

San Joaquin River

San Joaquin River
Marsh Creek
Mokelumne River (jump to tributaries)
Old River (side channel of San Joaquin River)
Middle River (side channel of San Joaquin River)
Bear Creek
Calaveras River (jump to tributaries)
Mormon Slough (distributary of Calaveras River)
French Camp Slough
Littlejohns Creek
Rock Creek
Lone Tree Creek
Corral Hollow Creek (historical)
Stanislaus River (jump to tributaries)
Hospital Creek
Ingram Creek
Tuolumne River (jump to tributaries)
Del Puerto Creek
Salado Creek
Orestimba Creek
Crow Creek
Merced River (jump to tributaries)
Mud Slough
Los Banos Creek
Garzas Creek
San Luis Creek
Bear Creek
Deep Slough
Owens Creek
Mariposa Creek
Deadman Creek
Mariposa Slough
Eastside Bypass (man-made floodway, occasionally receiving floodwater from the upstream San Joaquin River via Chowchilla Bypass Structure, near Mendota)
Chowchilla River
Fresno River
Dry Creek
Fresno Slough (also carries floodwaters diverted from the Kings River via North Fork distributary)
Friant Dam, Millerton Lake
Fine Gold Creek
Willow Creek
Stevenson Creek
Shaver Lake
Big Creek
Huntington Lake
Rock Creek
Mammoth Pool Dam, Mammoth Pool Reservoir
Kaiser Creek
Jackass Creek
South Fork San Joaquin River
Mono Creek
Vermilion Valley Dam, Lake Thomas A. Edison
Bear Creek
Florence Lake Dam, Florence Lake
Piute Creek
Evolution Creek
Granite Creek
North Fork San Joaquin River
Middle Fork San Joaquin River
Fish Creek
Minaret Creek
Thousand Island Lake (San Joaquin River source)

Mokelumne River

Mokelumne River
Snodgrass Slough
Cosumnes River
Skunk Creek
Badger Creek
Deer Creek
Arkansas Creek
Little Indian Creek
Big Canyon Creek
Big Indian Creek
North Fork Cosumnes River
Camp Creek
Sly Park Creek
Steely Fork Cosumnes River
Middle Fork Cosumnes River
Scott Creek
Dogtown Creek
Dry Creek
Coyote Creek
Jackson Creek
Sutter Creek
Rancheria Creek
North Fork Dry Creek
South Fork Dry Creek
Camanche Dam, Camanche Lake
Pardee Dam, Pardee Reservoir
North Fork Mokelumne River
Tiger Creek
Blue Creek
Bear River
Salt Springs Dam, Salt Springs Reservoir
Summit City Creek
Pacific Creek
Middle Fork Mokelumne River
South Fork Mokelumne River
Licking Fork
Forest Creek

Note: In the Delta the Mokelumne River divides into two short branches, also called the "North Fork" and "South Fork", which recombine before reaching the San Joaquin River.

Calaveras River
Calaveras River
New Hogan Dam, New Hogan Lake
North Fork Calaveras River
Murray Creek
Jesus Maria Creek
Esperanza Creek
South Fork Calaveras River
Calaveritas Creek
San Antonio Creek
San Domingo Creek
Cherokee Creek

Stanislaus River

Stanislaus River
Tulloch Dam, Tulloch Reservoir
Black Creek
New Melones Dam, New Melones Lake
Mormon Creek
Angels Creek
Coyote Creek
South Fork Stanislaus River
Deer Creek
Herring Creek
Rose Creek
Knight Creek
Eagle Creek
Middle Fork Stanislaus River
Beardsley Dam, Beardsley Lake
Mill Creek
Donnells Dam, Donnell Lake
Niagara Creek
Dardanelles Creek
Clark Fork Middle Fork Stanislaus River
Arnot Creek
Disaster Creek
Eagle Creek
Deadman Creek
Summit Creek
Kennedy Creek
North Fork Stanislaus River
Griswold Creek
Soap Creek
Skull Creek
Mill Creek
Beaver Creek
Highland Creek
New Spicer Meadow Dam, New Spicer Meadow Reservoir
Bloods Creek
Silver Creek

Tuolumne River

Tuolumne River
Dry Creek
New Don Pedro Dam, Lake Don Pedro
Moccasin Creek
Sullivan Creek
Woods Creek
North Fork Tuolumne River
Clavey River
Hull Creek
Reynolds Creek
Bourland Creek
Bell Creek
Lily Creek
South Fork Tuolumne River
Middle Fork Tuolumne River
Cottonwood Creek
Cherry Creek 
Eleanor Creek
Frog Creek
Kendrick Creek
Cherry Valley Dam, Cherry Lake
West Fork Cherry Creek
East Fork Cherry Creek
North Fork Cherry Creek
O'Shaughnessy Dam, Hetch Hetchy Reservoir
Falls Creek
Tilden Creek
Tiltill Creek
Rancheria Creek
Breeze Creek
Stubblefield Canyon
Piute Creek
Register Creek
Ten Lakes Basin Creek
Cathedral Creek
South Fork Cathedral Creek
Return Creek
Matterhorn Canyon
Conness Creek
Alkali Creek
Dingley Creek
Delaney Creek
Budd Creek
Unicorn Creek
Dana Fork Tuolumne River
Gaylor Creek
Parker Pass Creek
Mono Pass Creek
Lyell Fork Tuolumne River
Rafferty Creek
Evelyn Lake Creek
Ireland Creek
Kuna Creek

Merced River

Merced River
Bear Creek
Dry Creek
New Exchequer Dam and Lake McClure
North Fork Merced River
South Fork Merced River
Alder Creek
Bishop Creek
Elevenmile Creek
Rail Creek
Bridalveil Creek
Yosemite Creek
Tenaya Creek
Snow Creek
Illilouette Creek
Fletcher Creek
Lewis Creek
Florence Creek
Red Peak Fork
Red Devil Creek
Lyell Fork
Hutching Creek
Merced Peak Fork
Triple Peak Fork
Foerster Creek

Tulare Basin

Usually an endorheic basin, waters in this region all eventually would reach Tulare Lake.  This region would overflow into the San Joaquin River during flood years when Tulare Lake overflowed. Streams are listed clockwise around the Tulare Basin, starting at the Kings River:
Kings River (jump to tributaries)
Sand Creek
Cross Creek
Mill Creek
Kaweah River (jump to tributaries)
Elbow Creek
St. John's River (distributary of Kaweah River)
Cottonwood Creek
Lewis Creek
Tule River (jump to tributaries)
Deer Creek
Pothole Creek
Gordon Creek
Tyler Creek
White River
Coarse Gold Creek
Arrastre Creek
Chalaney Creek
Rag Gulch
Five Dog Creek
Willow Springs Creek
Deer Creek
Poso Creek
Little Creek
Rattlesnake Creek
Little Poso Creek
Cedar Creek
Lumreau Creek
Von Hellum Creek
Spear Creek
Kern River (jump to tributaries)
Caliente Creek
Walker Basin Creek
Rancheria Creek
Tehachapi Creek
Indian Creek
Tejon Creek
El Paso Creek
Pastoria Creek
Grapevine Creek
Tecuya Creek
Salt Creek
Pleito Creek
San Emigdio Creek
Los Lobos Creek
Santiago Creek
Bitter Creek
Bitterwater Creek
Sandy Creek
Buena Vista Creek
Salt Creek
Chico Creek
Santos Creek
Media Agua Creek
Bitterwater Creek
Avenal Creek
Baby King Creek
Canoas Creek
Los Gatos Creek
Zapato Chino Creek

Kings River

Kings River (Divides into the North Fork, South Fork and Clark's Fork distributaries in the San Joaquin Valley, not to be confused with the North and South Forks in the Sierra Nevada headwaters. North Fork connects to the Fresno Slough that drains into the San Joaquin River (during high flows), before turning to the south rejoining with the other distributaries to reform the Kings River and emptying into Tulare Lake.)
Fish Creek
Hughes Creek
Mill Creek
Pine Flat Dam, Pine Flat Lake
Deer Creek
Zebe Creek
Russian Charlie Creek
Lefever Creek
Billy Creek
Sycamore Creek
Big Creek
Sacata Creek
Redoak Creek
Lower Rancheria Creek
Sycamore Springs Creek
North Fork Kings River
Dinkey Creek
Basin Creek
Patterson Creek
Weir Creek
Black Rock Creek
Williams Creek
Mule Creek 
Rancheria Creek
Teakettle Creek
Long Meadow Creek
Wishon Dam, Wishon Reservoir
Woodchuck Creek
Short Hair Creek
Sharp Creek
Helms Creek
Courtright Dam, Courtright Reservoir
Dusy Creek
Post Corral Creek
Burnt Corral Creek
Flemming Creek
Nichols Canyon
Meadow Brook
Fall Creek
Division Lake
Regiment Lake
Davis Creek 
Mill Flat Creek
Verplank Creek
Fox Canyon Creek
Converse Creek
Spring Creek
Cabin Creek
Garlic Meadow Creek
Rough Creek
Ten Mile Creek
Middle Fork Kings River
Deer Canyon Creek 
Brush Canyon Creek
Tombstone Creek
Wren Creek
Silver Creek
Crown Creek
Rogers Creek
Gorge of Despair
Crystal Creek
Blue Canyon Creek
Lost Canyon Creek
Rattlesnake Creek 
Alpine Creek 
Dog Creek
Kennedy Creek
Dougherty Creek
Horseshoe Creek
Goddard Creek
Disappearing Creek
Windy Canyon Creek
Cartridge Creek
Rimbaud Creek
Palisade Creek
Cataract Creek
Glacier Creek
Dusy Branch
Helen Lake
South Fork Kings River (This is the actual river that flows through Kings Canyon)
Lockwood Creek
Redwood Creek
Windy Gulch
Boulder Creek
Grizzly Creek 
Lightning Creek 
Deer Cove Creek 
Lewis Creek
Comb Creek
Sheep Creek
Hotel Creek
Roaring River
Sugarloaf Creek
Ferguson Creek
Granite Creek
Copper Creek
Avalanche Creek
Bubbs Creek
Sphinx Creek
Charlotte Creek
Cross Creek
North Guard Creek
East Creek
Glacier Creek
Gardiner Creek
Woods Creek
Woods Creek
Arrow Creek
Kid Creek

Kaweah River

Kaweah River (Divides into the St. John's River, Mill Creek, Packwood Creek and other distributaries in the San Joaquin Valley. Some of these distributaries eventually rejoin to form Cross Creek, which continues southwest to the Tulare Lake bed.)
Yokohl Creek
Lime Kiln Creek (Dry Creek)
Terminus Dam, Lake Kaweah
Greasy Creek
Horse Creek
South Fork Kaweah River
Cinnamon Creek
Grouse Creek
North Fork Kaweah River
Yucca Creek
Eshom Creek
Redwood Creek
Dorst Creek
Stony Creek
Salt Creek
East Fork Kaweah River
Squirrel Creek
Horse Creek
Monarch Creek
Eagle Creek
Crystal Creek
Franklin Creek
Marble Fork Kaweah River
Elk Creek
Suwanee Creek
Halstead Creek
Sherman Creek
Wolverton Creek
Clover Creek
Stillman Creek
Horse Creek
Middle Fork Kaweah River
Paradise Creek
Crescent Creek
Dome Creek
Panther Creek
Mehrten Creek
Castle Creek
Buck Creek
Cliff Creek
Timber Gap Creek
Granite Creek
Eagle Scout Creek
Lone Pine Creek
Hamilton Creek

Tule River
Tule River
Deep Creek
Elk Bayou
Success Dam, Lake Success
South Fork Tule River
Rocky Creek
Bear Creek
North Fork Tule River
Bear Creek
Backbone Creek
Pine Creek
Middle Fork Tule River
North Fork Middle Fork Tule River
Alder Creek
South Fork Middle Fork Tule River

Kern River

Kern River
Cottonwood Creek
Lucas Creek
Mill Creek
Erskine Creek
Isabella Dam, Lake Isabella
North Fork Kern River
Cannell Creek
Salmon Creek
Tobias Creek
Brush Creek
South Creek
Dry Meadow Creek
Peppermint Creek
Durrwood Creek
Needlerock Creek
Freeman Creek
Lloyd Meadows Creek
Little Kern River
Fish Creek
Deep Creek 
Deep Creek
Clicks Creek
Sagebrush Gulch
Alpine Creek
Mountaineer Creek
Pecks Canyon Creek
Table Meadow Creek
Soda Springs Creek
Lion Creek
Willow Creek
Tamrack Creek
Rifle Creek
Shotgun Creek
Pistol Creek
Rattlesnake Creek
Deadman Canyon Creek
Soda Creek
Osa Creek
Hockett Peak Creek
Grouse Canyon Creek
Manzanita Canyon Creek
Ninemile Creek
Cold Meadow Creek
Red Rock Creek
Long Canyon Creek
Long Stringer
Lost Trout Creek
Hells Hole Creek
Angora Creek
Hell For Sure Creek
Leggett Creek
Grasshopper Creek
Little Kern Lake Creek
Rough Creek
Coyote Creek
Golden Trout Creek
Laurel Creek
Rattlesnake Creek
Big Arroyo
Willow Creek
Soda Creek
Lost Canyon Creek
Funston Creek
Chagoopa Creek
Rock Creek
Siberian Pass Creek
Red Spur Creek
Whitney Creek
Crabtree Creek
Wallace Creek
Kern-Kaweah River
Picket Creek
Tyndall Creek
Milestone Creek
South Fork Kern River
Kelso Creek
Canebrake Creek
Bartolas Creek
Palome Creek
Long Valley Creek
Taylor Creek
Manter Creek
Tibbets Creek
Trout Creek
Fish Creek
Bitter Creek
Lost Creek
Crag Creek
Honeybee Creek 
Summit Creek 
Cow Canyon Creek 
Snake Creek
Soda Creek 
Monache Creek 
Schaefer Stringer 
Strawberry Creek 
Long Stringer 
Dry Creek
Mulkey Creek
Movie Stringer 
Lewis Stringer 
Kern Peak Stringer

Central Coast
Rivers that empty into the Pacific Ocean between the Golden Gate and Point Arguello, arranged in order from north to south.

For details of the San Mateo coast, see List of watercourses in the San Francisco Bay Area.

San Gregorio Creek
Pescadero Creek
Butano Creek
Little Butano Creek
South Fork Butano Creek
North Fork Butano Creek
Honsinger Creek
Peters Creek
Fall Creek
Waterman Creek
San Vicente Creek (Santa Cruz County)
San Lorenzo River
Carbonera Creek
Zayante Creek
Bean Creek
Pajaro River (jump to tributaries)
Elkhorn Slough
Carneros Creek
Salinas River (jump to tributaries)
Carmel River
Malpaso Creek
Little Sur River
Big Sur River
Pfeiffer-Redwood Creek
McWay Creek
Old Creek
Toro Creek
Morro Creek
Chorro Creek
Los Osos Creek
San Luis Obispo Creek
Pismo Creek
Arroyo Grande Creek
Los Berros Creek
Tar Spring Creek
Santa Maria River (jump to tributaries)
San Antonio Creek
Santa Ynez River (jump to tributaries)

Pajaro River
Pajaro River
Pacheco Creek
San Benito River
Clear Creek
Tres Piños Creek
Salsipuedes Creek
Corralitos Creek

Salinas River

Salinas River
Gabilan Creek
Chualar Creek
Arroyo Seco
Reliz Creek
Vaqueros Creek
Santa Lucia Creek
Tassajara Creek
Lost Valley Creek
Chalone Creek
Topo Creek
Monroe Creek
San Lorenzo Creek
Lewis Creek
Pine Creek
Pancho Rico Creek
Sargent Creek
San Antonio River
San Antonio Dam, San Antonio Lake
Jolon Creek
Mission Creek
North Fork San Antonio River
Nacimiento River
Nacimiento Dam, Lake Nacimiento
Las Tablas Creek
Little Burnett Creek
Los Bueyes Creek
Gabilan Creek
Stony Creek
San Miguel Creek
Negro Fork
Big Sandy Creek
Estrella River
Huerhuero Creek
Cholame Creek
Little Cholame Creek
San Juan Creek
Paso Robles Creek
Atascadero Creek
Santa Margarita Creek
Rinconadas Creek
Pilitas Creek
Salinas Dam, Santa Margarita Lake
Alamo Creek
Toro Creek
Pozo Creek

Santa Maria River

Santa Maria River
Nipomo Creek
Orcutt Creek
Cuyama River
Twitchell Dam, Twitchell Reservoir
Huasna River
Huasna Creek
Arroyo Seco
Stony Creek
Trout Creek
Alamo Creek
Jollo Creek
Aliso Creek
Santa Barbara Canyon
Quatal Canyon
Apache Canyon
Alamo Creek
Sisquoc River
Tepusquet Creek
La Brea Creek
North Fork La Brea Creek
South Fork La Brea Creek
Manzana Creek
Water Canyon
Abel Canyon
South Fork Sisquoc River

Santa Ynez River

Santa Ynez River
Salsipuedes Creek
El Jaro Creek
Zaca Creek
Nojoqui Creek
Alisal Creek
Alamo Pintado Creek
Calabazal Creek
Santa Agueda Creek
Bradbury Dam, Lake Cachuma
Cachuma Creek
Santa Cruz Creek
Mono Creek
Indian Creek
Agua Caliente Creek
Juncal Creek

South Coast
Rivers that empty into the Pacific Ocean southeast of Point Arguello, arranged from north to south:

Point Arguello to Santa Monica
Goleta Slough
Carneros Creek
Atascadero Creek
Montecito Creek
Cold Springs Creek
East Fork Cold Springs Creek
West Fork Cold Springs Creek
Oak Creek
San Ysidro Creek
Romero Creek
Picay Creek
Toro Canyon Creek
Garapata Creek
Arroyo Paredon
Santa Monica Creek
Franklin Creek
Carpinteria Creek
Gobernador Creek
Eldorado Creek
Steer Creek
Rincon Creek
Casitas Creek
Sulphur Creek
Catharina Creek
Los Sauces Creek
Madrianio Creek
Padre Juan Canyon
Ventura River (jump to tributaries)
Santa Clara River (jump to tributaries)
Calleguas Creek
Malibu Creek
Topanga Creek

Santa Clara River

Santa Clara River
Santa Paula Creek
Sisar Creek
Boulder Creek
Sespe Creek
Little Sespe Creek
Tar Creek
West Fork Sespe Creek
Alder Creek
Park Creek
Timber Creek
Trout Creek
Piedra Blanca Creek
Rose Valley Creek
Rock Creek
Potrero John Creek
Munson Creek
Cherry Creek
Adobe Creek
Abadi Creek
Hopper Canyon Creek
Piru Creek
Santa Felicia Dam, Lake Piru
Devil Canyon
Canton Canyon
Agua Blanca Creek
Fish Creek
Pyramid Dam, Pyramid Lake
Gorman Creek
Buck Creek
Snowy Creek
Smith Fork
Dry Creek
Lockwood Creek
Mutau Creek
Alamo Creek
Little Mutau Creek
Sheep Creek
Cedar Creek
Castaic Creek
Charlie Canyon
Violin Canyon
Castaic Dam, Castaic Lake
Elizabeth Lake Canyon
Pine Canyon
Fish Canyon
Salt Creek
Bouquet Canyon
South Fork Santa Clara River
Placerita Creek
Newhall Creek
Mint Canyon
Agua Dulce Canyon
Mill Canyon
Acton Canyon
Aliso Canyon
Kentucky Springs Canyon

Ventura River
Ventura River
Manuel Canyon
Cañada Larga
Cañada de Alisos
Coyote Creek
Lake Casitas
Laguna Creek
Willow Creek
Santa Ana Creek
Roble-Casitas Canal
Poplin Creek
Deep Cat Lake
East Fork Coyote Creek
West Fork Coyote Creek
Matilija Creek
Rattlesnake Creek
Lime Creek
Murietta Creek
Middle Fork Matilija Creek
Upper North Fork Matilija Creek
North Fork Matilija Creek (This and Matilija Creek form the Ventura River's headwaters.)

Santa Monica to San Clemente

Ballona Creek
Dominguez Channel
Los Angeles River (jump to tributaries)
San Gabriel River (jump to tributaries)
Santa Ana River (jump to tributaries)
Newport Bay and Upper Newport Bay estuary
Big Canyon (Newport Bay)
San Diego Creek
Peters Canyon Wash
Agua Chinon Creek
Serrano Creek
Big Canyon Creek
Laguna Canyon
El Toro Creek
Laguna Lakes
Aliso Creek
Wood Canyon Creek
Sulphur Creek
Salt Creek
San Juan Creek
Trabuco Creek
Oso Creek
Tijeras Canyon Creek
Cañada Gobernadora
Bell Canyon
Hot Springs Creek
Prima Deshecha Cañada
Segunda Deshecha Cañada

Los Angeles River
Los Angeles River
Compton Creek
Rio Hondo
Santa Anita Creek
Arroyo Seco
Verdugo Wash
Burbank Western Channel
Tujunga Wash
Big Tujunga Creek
Lucas Creek
Mill Creek
Alder Creek
Little Tujunga Creek
Pacoima Wash
Bull Creek
Aliso Creek
Limekiln Canyon
Wilbur Canyon
Browns Canyon Wash
Diablo Canyon Creek
Mormon Canyon Creek
Bell Creek
Dayton Creek
Woolsey Canyon Creek
Arroyo Calabasas
Dry Creek

San Gabriel River
San Gabriel River
Coyote Creek
Carbon Creek
Moody Creek
Fullerton Creek
La Canada Verde Creek
La Mirada Creek
Brea Creek
San Jose Flood Diversion Channel
Tonner Canyon
Imperial Creek
East Fork San Gabriel River
West Fork San Gabriel River

Santa Ana River

Santa Ana River
Greenville-Banning Channel
Santiago Creek
Black Star Canyon Creek
Silverado Canyon
Brush Creek
Aliso Creek
Fresno Canyon
Wardlow Wash
Chino Creek
Mill Creek
Etiwanda Creek
Cucamonga Creek
Deer Creek
San Antonio Creek
Temescal Creek
Cajalco Canyon
Lake Mathews
Coldwater Canyon Creek
Lake Elsinore
San Jacinto River
Salt Creek
North Fork San Jacinto River
South Fork San Jacinto River
Warm Creek
Lytle Creek
Cajon Wash
South Fork Lytle Creek
Middle Fork Lytle Creek
North Fork Lytle Creek
City Creek
Plunge Creek
Mill Creek
Frustration Creek
Monkeyface Creek
Falls Creek
Vivian Creek
Morton Creek
Deep Creek
Government Creek
Warm Springs Creek
Alder Creek
Keller Creek
Monroe Creek
Crystal Creek
Breakneck Creek
Bear Creek
Big Bear Lake
South Fork Santa Ana River
Lost Creek
Wildhorse Creek
Cienaga Seca Creek
Heart Bar Creek
Coon Creek

San Clemente to Mexican border
San Mateo Creek
Cristianitos Creek
Talega Creek
Gabino Creek
La Paz Creek
Devil Canyon Creek
Cold Spring Canyon Creek
Nickel Creek (San Mateo Creek)
Bluewater Creek
Tenaja Creek
Los Alamos Canyon Creek
Wildhorse Canyon Creek 
San Onofre Creek
South Fork San Onofre Creek
North Fork San Onofre Creek
Jardine Creek
Foley Creek
Horno Creek
Las Flores Creek
Piedra de Lumbre Canyon Creek
Aliso Creek (San Diego County)
French Creek (San Diego County)
Cockleburr Creek
Santa Margarita River (jump to tributaries)
San Luis Rey River (jump to tributaries)
 Loma Alta Creek
 Buena Vista Lagoon
 Buena Vista Creek
 Agua Hedionda Lagoon
 Agua Hedionda Creek
 Buena Creek (San Diego)
 Escondido Creek
San Dieguito River (jump to tributaries)
San Diego River (jump to tributaries) - historically drained into San Diego Bay, but modern flood control channel bypasses the north shore of the bay and empties directly to the Pacific Ocean)
San Diego Bay outlet (jump to tributaries)
Tijuana River

Santa Margarita River
Santa Margarita River
Newton Canyon
Pueblitos Canyon
Wood Canyon
DeLuz Creek
Sandia Creek
Rainbow Creek
Temecula Creek
 Pechanga Creek
 Vail Lake Dam, Vail Lake
 Kolb Creek
 Arroyo Seco Creek
 Wilson Creek
 Long Canyon
 Cottonwood Creek
 Tule Creek
 Chihuahua Creek
 Rattlesnake Creek
 Kohler Canyon
Murrieta Creek
 Empire Creek
 Long Canyon
 Santa Gertrudis Creek
 Tucalota Creek
 Rawson Canyon 
 Long Valley Creek
 Warm Springs Creek 
 French Valley Creek
 Kalmia Creek
 Miller Canyon Creek
 Cole Canyon Creek 
 Vail Canyon Creek
 Slaughterhouse Canyon 
 Bundy Canyon

San Luis Rey River
San Luis Rey River
West Fork San Luis Rey River

San Dieguito River
San Dieguito River
 Santa Maria Creek (San Diego)
 Santa Ysabel Creek
 Temescal Creek (San Diego)

San Diego River
San Diego River
Oak Canyon Creek
Spring Canyon Creek
Forester Creek
Los Coches Creek
San Vicente Creek
Wildcat Canyon Creek
Chocolate Creek
Conejos Creek
Sand Creek
Isham Creek
Boulder Creek
Cedar Creek
Ritchie Creek
Dye Canyon Creek
Iron Springs Canyon Creek	
Temescal Creek
Sentenac Creek
Coleman Creek
Baily Creek
Eastwood Creek

San Diego Bay
Tributaries entering San Diego Bay are arranged from North to South:
Chollas Creek
Paradise Creek
Sweetwater River
Otay River

Gulf of California
Rivers that empty into the Gulf of California:
Colorado River
Milpitas Wash
McCoy Wash
Gene Wash
Chemehuevi Wash
Piute Wash

Carrizo Plain
The Carrizo Plain is a large enclosed valley near the Central Coast which drains into Soda Lake.

 Wallace Creek

Salton Sea
Rivers that empty into the Salton Sea:
Salt Creek
Dos Palmas Creek
Red Canyon Wash
Box Canyon Wash
Whitewater River
North Fork Whitewater River
Middle Fork Whitewater River
South Fork Whitewater River
San Gorgonio River
Portrero Creek
Smith Creek
Montgomery Creek
Hathaway Creek
Twin Pines Creek
Brown Creek
One Horse Creek
Snow Creek
West Fork Snow Creek
East Branch Snow Creek
East Fork Snow Creek
Falls Creek
Garnet Wash
Super Creek
Mission Creek
North Fork Mission Creek
South Form Mission Creek
West Fork Mission Creek
Morongo Wash
Dry Morongo Wash
Dry Morongo Creek
Big Morongo Wash
Little Morongo Wash
Chino Canyon Wash
Palm Canyon Wash
Tahquitz Creek
Tahquitz Falls
Cathedral Canyon Wash
Deep Canyon Stormwater Channel
Dead Indian Creek
Grape Vine Creek
Ebbens Creek
Carrizo Creek
Cat Creek
Ramon Creek
Deep Canyon Creek
Sheep Creek
Coyote Creek
Thousand Palm Canyon Wash
Barton Canyon Wash
Alano Canyon Wash
Sheep Canyon Wash
Travertine Palms Wash
Garner Wash
Wonderstone Wash
Gravel Wash
Big Wash
Grave Wash
Coral Wash
Palm Wash
Anza Ditch
Arroyo Salada
Tule Wash
San Felipe Creek
Carrizo Creek, Carrizo Wash
Borrego Sink Wash
New River
Coyote Wash
 Palm Canyon Wash 
 South Fork Coyote Wash
 Myer Creek
 Pinto Wash
Alamo River

Great Basin
Rivers in the Great Basin, arranged roughly north to south:

Tule Lake
Lost River
Rock Creek
Clear Lake Reservoir
Willow Creek
North Fork Willow Creek
Boles Creek
Fletcher Creek

Honey Lake

Susan River
Willow Creek
Petes Creek
Balls Canyon
Snowstorm Creek
Secret Creek
Piute Creek
Willard Creek
Skedaddle Creek
Long Valley Creek
Dry Valley Creek
Baxter Creek

Pyramid Lake (in Nevada)

Truckee River
Little Truckee River
Martis Creek
Prosser Creek
Trout Creek
Cold Creek
Lake Tahoe (tributaries clockwise from Lower Truckee River)
Griff Creek
Incline Creek
North Canyon Creek
Trout Creek (Lake Tahoe)
Upper Truckee River
Taylor Creek
Meeks Creek
Blackwood Creek
Ward Creek

Carson Sink (in Nevada)

Carson River (in Nevada)
East Fork Carson River
Markleeville Creek
Hot Springs Creek
Pleasant Valley Creek
Monitor Creek
Silver Creek
Wolf Creek
Silver King Creek
West Fork Carson River
Willow Creek
Red Lake Creek

Walker Lake (in Nevada)
Walker River (in Nevada)
East Walker River
Buckeye Creek
Swauger Creek
Robinson Creek
Green Creek
West Walker River
Mill Creek
Lost Cannon Creek
Deep Creek
Little Walker River
Hot Creek
Molybdenite Creek
Silver Creek
Wolf Creek
Leavitt Creek
West Fork West Walker River

Mono Lake
Rivers draining into saline and endorheic Mono Lake in eastern California, from north and proceeding counterclockwise:
Cottonwood Creek
Rancheria Gulch
Wilson Creek
Mill Creek
Deer Creek
South Fork Mill Creek
Lake Canyon Creek
Dechambeau Creek
Lee Vining Creek
Beartrack Creek
Gibbs Canyon Creek
Warren Fork
Mine Creek
Glacier Canyon Creek
Saddlebag Creek
Rush Creek
Walker Creek
Parker Creek
Alger Creek
Reversed Creek
Fern Creek
Yost Creek
Crest Creek
Dry Creek

Owens Lake

Owens River
Lone Pine Creek
Big Pine Creek
Bishop Creek
Rock Creek
Pine Creek
Morgan Creek
Hot Creek
Deadman Creek

Death Valley
Streams terminating in the Badwater Basin in Death Valley National Park.
Salt Creek
Furnace Creek Wash
Emigrant Wash
Death Valley Wash
Amargosa River
Wingate Wash
Salt Creek (may carry overflow from the Mojave River basin in extremely wet years)
Rock Valley Wash
Fortymile Wash

Antelope Valley-Fremont Valley watersheds
Streams terminating in various dry lakes in the Antelope Valley and Fremont Valley (Koehn Lake, Rosamond Lake, Rogers Dry Lake and others), draining from the southeastern Tehachapi Mountains and northern San Gabriel Mountains, listed counterclockwise starting from north:
Cottonwood Creek
Cache Creek
Sand Creek
Oak Creek
Cottonwood Creek
Pescado Creek
Los Alamos Creek
Amargosa Creek
Pine Creek
Anaverde Creek
Little Rock Creek
South Fork Little Rock Creek
Big Rock Creek
Pallett Creek
Sandrock Creek
South Fork Big Rock Creek
Mescal Creek
Le Montaine Creek

Soda Lake (Mojave River drainage)

Kelso Wash
Mojave River
Manix Wash
Daggett Wash
Wild Wash
Buckthorn Wash
Fremont Wash
West Fork Mojave River
Grass Valley Creek
East Fork West Fork Mojave River
Deep Creek
Kinley Creek
Willow Creek
Coxey Creek
Holcomb Creek
Cox Creek
Hooks Creek
Little Bear Creek
Shake Creek
Sheep Creek
Crab Creek
Green Valley Creek

See also
Geography of California
List of lakes in California
List of rivers of the Americas by coastline
List of rivers of the United States
Water in California

References

External links

Friends of the River – California Rivers
California Rivers Assessment
Popular Rafting River in California

Rivers
California